The 1983 Madrilenian regional election was held on Sunday, 8 May 1983, to elect the 1st Assembly of the Autonomous Community of Madrid. All 94 seats in the Assembly were up for election. The election was held simultaneously with regional elections in twelve other autonomous communities and local elections all throughout Spain.

The election resulted in a landslide victory for the Spanish Socialist Workers' Party (PSOE), the only time to date the party has achieved this in a Madrilenian regional election. The People's Coalition, an electoral alliance formed by the People's Alliance (AP), the People's Democratic Party (PDP) and the Liberal Union (UL), emerged as the second largest group in the Assembly, whereas the Communist Party of Spain (PCE) improved on its 1982 results in the region and secured 9 seats with 8.8% of the vote. The result ensured Socialist Joaquín Leguina would become the first President of the Community of Madrid, though the PSOE showed a willingness in collaborating with the PCE.

Overview

Electoral system
The Assembly of Madrid was the devolved, unicameral legislature of the autonomous community of Madrid, having legislative power in regional matters as defined by the Spanish Constitution and the Madrilenian Statute of Autonomy, as well as the ability to vote confidence in or withdraw it from a President of the Community. Voting for the Assembly was on the basis of universal suffrage, which comprised all nationals over 18 years of age, registered in the Community of Madrid and in full enjoyment of their political rights.

All members of the Assembly of Madrid were elected using the D'Hondt method and a closed list proportional representation, with an electoral threshold of five percent of valid votes—which included blank ballots—being applied regionally. The Assembly was entitled to one member per each 50,000 inhabitants or fraction greater than 25,000.

The electoral law provided that parties, federations, coalitions and groupings of electors were allowed to present lists of candidates. However, groupings of electors were required to secure the signature of at least 0.1 percent of the electors registered in the constituency for which they sought election—needing to secure, in any case, the signature of 500 electors—. Electors were barred from signing for more than one list of candidates. Concurrently, parties and federations intending to enter in coalition to take part jointly at an election were required to inform the relevant Electoral Commission within fifteen days of the election being called.

Election date
The Government of Spain was required to call an election to the Assembly of Madrid before 31 May 1983. In the event of an investiture process failing to elect a regional President within a two-month period from the first ballot, the Assembly was to be automatically dissolved and a snap election called, with elected deputies merely serving out what remained of their four-year terms.

Opinion polls
The table below lists voting intention estimates in reverse chronological order, showing the most recent first and using the dates when the survey fieldwork was done, as opposed to the date of publication. Where the fieldwork dates are unknown, the date of publication is given instead. The highest percentage figure in each polling survey is displayed with its background shaded in the leading party's colour. If a tie ensues, this is applied to the figures with the highest percentages. The "Lead" column on the right shows the percentage-point difference between the parties with the highest percentages in a poll. When available, seat projections determined by the polling organisations are displayed below (or in place of) the percentages in a smaller font; 48 seats were required for an absolute majority in the Assembly of Madrid.

Results

Overall

Elected legislators
The following table lists the elected legislators sorted by order of election.

Aftermath
Investiture processes to elect the President of the Community of Madrid required for an absolute majority—more than half the votes cast—to be obtained in the first ballot. If unsuccessful, a new ballot would be held 48 hours later requiring of a simple majority—more affirmative than negative votes—to succeed. If none of such majorities were achieved, successive candidate proposals could be processed under the same procedure. In the event of the investiture process failing to elect a regional President within a two-month period from the first ballot, the Assembly would be automatically dissolved and a snap election called.

References
Opinion poll sources

Other

1983 in the Community of Madrid
Madrid
Regional elections in the Community of Madrid
May 1983 events in Europe